Niederfeulen is a small town in the commune of Feulen, in central Luxembourg.  , the town has a population of 1,092.currently population grow to 1321,male-female ratio is 1025 female per 1000 male.

Diekirch (canton)
Towns in Luxembourg